Thies Kaspareit (born 1 February 1964 in Oldenburg in Holstein) is a German equestrian and Olympic champion. He won a team gold medal in eventing at the 1988 Summer Olympics in Seoul.

References

1964 births
Living people
Olympic equestrians of West Germany
German male equestrians
Equestrians at the 1988 Summer Olympics
Olympic gold medalists for West Germany
German event riders
Olympic medalists in equestrian
Medalists at the 1988 Summer Olympics